Har Prasad Singh was an Indian politician. He was elected to the Lok Sabha, the lower house of the Parliament of India, as a member of the Indian National Congress.

References

External links
Official biographical sketch in Lok Sabha website

India MPs 1952–1957
India MPs 1957–1962
Lok Sabha members from Uttar Pradesh
1900 births
Year of death missing
Indian National Congress politicians from Uttar Pradesh